Clavelina cylindrica is a species of tunicate in the genus Clavelina. It is found in shallow waters around Australia.

Research
Clavelina cylindrica has yielded two novel alkaloids in 1993, cylindricine A, the first naturally occurring pyrrolo[2, 1-j]quinoline, and cylindricine B, a pyrido-[2,1-j]-quinoline ring compound. Further research the following year led to the discovery of further cylindricines C to G, and a further three, H to J in 1995.

References 

Enterogona
Animals described in 1834